Edmunds Glacier is located on Mount Rainier in the U.S. state of Washington. Named in 1883 for George F. Edmunds. The glacier lies on the western flank of the volcano below the steep, rocky Mowich Face and Sunset Face. Meltwater from the Edmunds Glacier feeds the Mowich River which eventually merges with the Puyallup River.

See also
List of glaciers in the United States

References

Glaciers of Mount Rainier
Glaciers of Washington (state)